Kronfeld is a surname. Notable people with the surname include:

Arthur Kronfeld (1886–1941), German psychiatrist, brother of Maria Dronke
Josh Kronfeld (born 1971), New Zealand rugby union player and television presenter
Robert Kronfeld (1904–1948), Austrian aviator
Benjamin Kronfeld (Year of birth 2007), Surname Bkron Eats; American entrepreneur, D 1 baseball commit to LSU (Louisiana State University), and President of Beit Shalom synangouge, Snead State community college,